Brave Words is an album by New Zealand group The Chills, released in 1987. It was produced by Mayo Thompson.

Track listing (LP version)
All songs written by Martin Phillips, except for where noted.

Side 1:
"Push"
"Rain" 
"Speak for Yourself"
"Look for the Good in Others and They'll See the Good in You"
"Wet Blanket"
"Ghosts"
Side 2:
"Dan Destiny and the Silver Dawn"
"Night of Chill Blue"
"16 Heart-Throbs"
"Brave Words"
"Dark Carnival"
"Creep" (Phillips, Idaho)

Track listing (CD version)
"Push"
"Rain"
"Speak for Yourself"
"Look for the Good in Others and They'll See the Good in You"
"Wet Blanket"
"Ghosts"
"House With 100 Rooms"
"Party in My Heart"
"Living in A Jungle"
"Dan Destiny and the Silver Dawn"
"Night of Chill Blue"
"16 Heart-Throbs"
"Brave Words"
"Dark Carnival"
"Creep"

References

1987 albums
The Chills albums
Flying Nun Records albums